El Barco may refer to:

El Barco de Ávila, a town in Spain
El Barco (settlement), the first Spanish settlement in northern Argentina
El Barco (Tucumán), a village in Argentina
El Barco, Alicante, a residential apartment building
El Barco (TV series), a Spanish TV series
El Barco Lake (Laguna El Barco or Lago El Barco), a lake in the Bío Bío Region of Chile
"El Barco", a 2021 song by Karol G from the album KG0516

See also
 Barco (disambiguation)